is a second class airport located  west of the city hall in Naha, Okinawa. It is Japan's seventh busiest airport and the primary air terminal for passengers and cargo traveling to and from Okinawa Prefecture, Japan, and handles scheduled international traffic to Taiwan, Hong Kong, South Korea, Thailand, Singapore and mainland China. The airport is also home to Naha Air Base of the Japan Air Self-Defense Force.

Naha Airport served 17.5 million passengers in 2014, an increase of roughly three million passengers in two years.

History
, an Imperial Japanese Navy airfield, opened in 1933. The base was taken over by the United States in 1945 and was renamed . Pan American World Airways and Northwest Orient began service to Naha in 1947.

The airport was closed for refurbishment between 1952 and 1954. Japan Airlines began service to Okinawa during this time and initially used Kadena Air Base.

Air America operated interisland flights to Miyako and Ishigaki from 1964 to 1967, when Southwest Airlines (now Japan Transocean Air) took over these routes.

Okinawa was returned to Japan in 1972. In 1982, Naha Airport was transferred from US military control to the Japan Air Self-Defense Force.

The basic and detailed design engineering works in addition to the later construction management phase of the main passenger terminal were awarded in the 1990s in part to the Japan Branch of the American design-build engineering company, The Austin Company, which joined Japanese firms in a joint venture design consortium.

Peach, a low-cost carrier based at Kansai International Airport in Osaka, announced that it would establish its second hub at Naha in July 2014, which would initially have flights to Osaka, Fukuoka, Ishigaki and Taipei. ANA Holdings, the parent company of both Peach and Vanilla Air, opened a new LCC terminal in a refurbished portion of the airport's cargo area in October 2012, and plans to open new international facilities in October 2014.

Development
The airport has been undergoing major development projects that will continue to transform the airport:
 In 2008, the government agreed to significantly expand the domestic terminal, which will require the relocation of cargo facilities and the international terminal.
 The construction of a second 2,700m parallel runway began on March 1, 2014 (opening March 26, 2020), on 160 hectares of reclaimed land. 
 The new international terminal opened in February 2014. The international terminal is again being expanded and will grow by 3000m2 in November 2016. A new building connecting the domestic and international terminals is due to be completed in 2020 along with the second runway.
 A LCCT terminal has been in operation since 2012.
 In addition, a 6 lane under bay tunnel for auto transport linking the airport with the Naha Port boosting the utility of the intermodal facility was completed in 2011. This tunnel will also link a 2.6 hectare Free Trade Zone near the Airport with another 122 hectare FTZ located at Nakagusuku Bay.

Terminals

 Domestic Terminal (1999) - replaced former domestic terminal, extended to include LCCT, other extensions works to conclude in 2016.
 Cargo Terminal (2009) - Former domestic terminal became the cargo terminal
 LCCT Terminal (2012) - north annex of domestic terminal (Peach Domestic & International only).
 New International Terminal (2014) - replaced old international terminal

Airlines and destinations

Passenger

Cargo service
All Nippon Airways operates an overnight cargo hub at Naha Airport, which receives inbound Boeing 767 freighter flights from key destinations in Japan, China and Southeast Asia between 1 and 4 a.m., followed by return flights between 4 and 6 a.m., allowing overnight service between these regional hubs as well as onward connections to other ANA and partner carrier flights.

The hub began operations in 2009; by 2013 it served eight cities, and ANA had chartered a Nippon Cargo Airlines Boeing 747 freighter to handle demand on the trunk route from Narita International Airport.

Statistics

Accidents and incidents

 On July 27, 1970, Flying Tiger Line Flight 45, a Douglas DC-8-63AF flying to Da Nang Air Force Base from Los Angeles via San Francisco and Tokyo, was on its final approach when it crashed 0.4 miles short of Runway 18, killing all 4 crew members.
 On December 11, 1994, Armaldo Forlani planted a bomb on Philippine Airlines Flight 434, which exploded while the flight was en route from Cebu to Tokyo, killing one passenger and injuring ten other passengers. The plane made an emergency landing at Naha Airport safely.
 On August 20, 2007, China Airlines Flight 120, a Boeing 737-800, was taxiing to the ramp after landing when suddenly a fire started beneath the right wing, quickly engulfing the entire plane. All passengers and crew members were evacuated safely. Investigations later revealed that part of the slat drive mechanism pierced the fuel tank, and the leaking fuel ignited when it came into contact with hot engine parts.
 On June 3, 2015, an All Nippon Airways Boeing 737 bound for Sapporo aborted takeoff at Naha after a JASDF CH-47 Chinook helicopter crossed its departure path without clearance. An inbound Japan Transocean Air flight landed on the same runway, stopping 400 meters behind the ANA aircraft, despite an air traffic control order to go around, which the JTA pilot claimed to have received after landing.

Access
The airport is served by the Okinawa Urban Monorail (Yui Rail) which carries passengers from Naha Airport Station to the center of Naha, and to the terminal at Tedako-Uranishi Station in Urasoe. Bus service is also available to many parts of Okinawa Island.

References

External links

 Airport website 
 Airport website 
 Airports of Okinawa
 Naha Airport Guide from Japan Airlines
 
 

Airports in Okinawa
Naha
Airports in Japan
Japan Air Self-Defense Force bases
Airports established in 1933